Walter Jay Skinner (September 12, 1927 – May 8, 2005) was a United States district judge of the United States District Court for the District of Massachusetts.

Education and career

Born in Washington, D.C., Skinner received an Artium Baccalaureus degree from Harvard University in 1948 and a Juris Doctor from Harvard Law School in 1952. He was in private practice in Boston, Massachusetts from 1952 to 1957, and in Scituate, Massachusetts from 1957 to 1963, and was also Scituate's town counsel and an assistant district attorney of Plymouth County, Massachusetts from 1957 to 1963. He was an assistant attorney general and chief of the Massachusetts Criminal Division from 1963 to 1965, thereafter returning to private practice in Boston until 1973.

Federal judicial service

On October 10, 1973, Skinner was nominated by President Richard Nixon to a seat on the United States District Court for the District of Massachusetts vacated by Judge Anthony Julian. Skinner was confirmed by the United States Senate on December 14, 1973, and received his commission on December 19, 1973. He assumed senior status on September 14, 1992, serving in that capacity until his death on May 8, 2005, in Concord, Massachusetts.

Skinner came to public attention in 1986 during the civil trials for contamination of the Woburn wells and water supply, first by imposing a gag order on the plaintiffs, preventing them from making public comment about the case; and then by throwing out the jury's guilty verdict against W. R. Grace on the grounds that he found some of their answers to the questions about the hydrogeological data to be confusing.  Skinner was portrayed by John Lithgow in the 1998 film A Civil Action about the Woburn case.

References

Sources
 

1927 births
2005 deaths
Harvard Law School alumni
Judges of the United States District Court for the District of Massachusetts
United States district court judges appointed by Richard Nixon
20th-century American judges